El Guerara District is a district of Ghardaïa Province, Algeria. It was named after its capital, El Guerrara.

Municipalities 
The district consists of only one municipality, El Guerrara.

References 

Districts of Ghardaïa Province